This is a list of the 1986 PGA Tour Qualifying School graduates. 53 players earned their 1987 PGA Tour card through Q-School in 1986. This was the first year that playing privileges went out to the top 50 and, in addition, those that tied for the top 50. The tournament was played over 108 holes at the PGA West Stadium Course, in La Quinta, California. Those earning cards split the $100,000 purse, with the winner earning $15,000. 

Sources:

References

PGA Tour Qualifying School
Golf in California
PGA Tour Qualifying School
PGA Tour Qualifying School